Bartschia frumari is a species of sea snail, a marine gastropod mollusc in the family Colubrariidae.

Description

Distribution

References

External links

Colubrariidae
Gastropods described in 2008